Hålandsdal is a former municipality in the old Hordaland county, Norway.  The  municipality existed from 1903 until 1964.  It encompassed the eastern part of what is now Bjørnafjorden Municipality in Vestland county.  It included the large lakes Skogseidvatnet and Gjønavatnet and all of their surrounding valleys.  The administrative centre of the municipality was the village of Holdhus where the Holdhus Church is located.

History
On 1 January 1903, the parish of Hålandsdal (historically spelled Haalandsdal) was separated from the municipality of Fusa to form a separate municipality of its own. Initially, Hålandsdal had a population of 647. It was a small municipality and so in the early 1960s, the Schei Committee recommended that it be merged with two of its neighbors: Fusa and Strandvik. So, on 1 January 1964, Hålandsdal was merged with Strandvik and most of Fusa, creating a new, larger municipality of Fusa. Prior to the merger, Hålandsdal had a population of 528.

Government

Municipal council
The municipal council  of Hålandsdal was made up of 13 representatives that were elected to four year terms.  The party breakdown of the final municipal council was as follows:

See also
List of former municipalities of Norway

References

Valleys of Vestland
Bjørnafjorden
Former municipalities of Norway
1903 establishments in Norway
1964 disestablishments in Norway